The 2008 Chinese GP2 Asia Series round was a GP2 Asia Series motor race held on 18 and 19 October 2008 at Shanghai International Circuit in Shanghai, China. It was the first round of the 2008–09 GP2 Asia Series. The race supported the 2008 Chinese Grand Prix.

Classification

Qualifying

Feature race

Sprint race

Standings after the event 

Drivers' Championship standings

Teams' Championship standings

 Note: Only the top five positions are included for both sets of standings.

Notes

References

GP2 Asia Series
GP2 Asia
Chinese GP2 Asia